Two Americas is a phrase used by Martin Luther King Jr. in his speech "The Other America" to describe the differences in what life is like for people of different social classes in the United States.
He gave this speech multiple times, including on April 14, 1967 at Stanford University.
 In the speech discusses the connections between racism and economic oppression and concludes that a Universal Basic Income is necessary to solve these problems:

I use this subject because there are literally two Americas. One America is beautiful for situation. And, in a sense, this America is overflowing with the milk of prosperity and the honey of opportunity. This America is the habitat of millions of people who have food and material necessities for their bodies; and culture and education for their minds; and freedom and human dignity for their spirits. In this America, millions of people experience every day the opportunity of having life, liberty, and the pursuit of happiness in all of their dimensions. And in this America millions of young people grow up in the sunlight of opportunity.

But tragically and unfortunately, there is another America. This other America has a daily ugliness about it that constantly transforms the ebulliency of hope into the fatigue of despair. In this America millions of work-starved men walk the streets daily in search for jobs that do not exist. In this America millions of people find themselves living in rat-infested, vermin-filled slums. In this America people are poor by the millions. They find themselves perishing on a lonely island of poverty in the midst of a vast ocean of material prosperity.

John Edwards

Former U.S. Senator and former presidential candidate John Edwards used the "Two Americas" concept in a 2004 speech, making it into a catch phrase referring to social stratification. The speech has since become popular and inspired many parodies and similar metaphors. 

Although not necessarily the most prominent issue for other candidates in the seasons in which he campaigned for president, poverty has typically been a mainstay of liberal politics and a major focus for Edwards' campaign efforts. Edwards has since expanded the metaphor further, for instance in a guest blog entry in the aftermath of Hurricane Katrina:

The following are excerpts from a speech given by Senator John Edwards as Democratic vice presidential nominee to the 2004 Democratic National Convention on 28 July 2004, based on the idea of Two Americas. For the complete transcript, see External links.

 “I have spent my life fighting for the kind of people I grew up with.  For two decades, I stood with kids and families against big HMOs and big insurance companies.  When I got to the Senate, I fought those same fights against the Washington lobbyists and for causes like the Patients' Bill of Rights.  I stand here tonight ready to work with you and John [Kerry] to make America stronger. And we have much work to do, because the truth is, we still live in a country where there are two different Americas... [applause] one, for all of those people who have lived the American dream and don't have to worry, and another for most Americans, everybody else who struggle to make ends meet every single day. It doesn't have to be that way..."

 “We can build one America where we no longer have two health care systems: one for families who get the best health care money can buy, and then one for everybody else rationed out by insurance companies, drug companies, HMOs.  Millions of Americans have no health coverage at all.  It doesn't have to be that way. We have a plan..."

 “We shouldn't have two public school systems in this country: one for the most affluent communities, and one for everybody else.  None of us believe that the quality of a child's education should be controlled by where they live or the affluence of the community they live in.  It doesn't have to be that way.  We can build one school system that works for all our kids, gives them a chance to do what they're capable of doing..."

 “John Kerry and I believe that we shouldn't have two different economies in America: one for people who are set for life, they know their kids and their grand-kids are going to be just fine; and then one for most Americans, people who live paycheck to paycheck..."

 “So let me give you some specifics.  First, we can create good-paying jobs in this country again.  We're going to get rid of tax cuts for companies who are outsourcing your jobs... [applause] and, instead, we're going to give tax breaks to American companies that are keeping jobs right here in America..."

 “Well, let me tell you how we're going to pay for it. And I want to be very clear about this. We are going to keep and protect the tax cuts for 98 percent of Americans -- 98 percent. We're going to roll back -- we're going to roll back the tax cuts for the wealthiest Americans. And we're going to close corporate loopholes..."

Edwards later revisited the Two Americas theme frequently in his 2008 presidential election campaign.

See also
Red states and blue states
Poverty in the United States
The Other America
Cross of Gold speech
I Have a Dream
Read my lips: no new taxes
One Nation Conservatism
One Nation Under God
Silent majority
Make America Great Again

References

External links
 The original speech from the 2004 Democratic National Convention
 A stump speech using the metaphor
 A 2007 campaign ad explaining the Two Americas concept

2004 Democratic National Convention
2004 speeches
American political catchphrases
John Edwards
Universal basic income in the United States